12° Strakonický Dudák is a brand of the Czech Republic's brewery Měšťanský pivovar Strakonice, a.s. Together with Nektar, it is distributed in the Strakonice District region. The name refers to a fictional bagpipe player who lived in the region.

External links
 Brewery's Web site.

Beer in the Czech Republic